Tropical Family is a banner for a musical collective of artists who came together in 2013 to collaborate on an album of tropical music and summer-y dance songs. The 12-track album was released on 1 July 2013, with 12 cover versions of well-known songs by diverse artists. A Deluxe edition was released in November with four additional tracks included.

Initially, Serge Gainsbourg's "Couleur café"  as performed by Louisy Joseph had been recorded, but eventually it was set aside in favor of Teri Moïse song "Les Poèmes de Michelle" as interpreted by Slaï on the album.

Track listing

Deluxe edition
On 18 November 2013, a Deluxe edition was released, that included the same track list in addition to four bonus tracks not found on the original release, being "Turn Me On" by Matt Houston and Kevin Lyttle, "Enamórame" by DJ Assad feat. Papi Sanchez & Luyannah, "Couleur Café" by Louisy Joseph and "Petites Iles" by Lynnsha & Kymaï1.

Track list

Charts

Album

Singles

References

Covers albums
2013 compilation albums